Vellakkuppayam is a 2014 Malayalam romantic drama film written and directed by Ramees Nandi.

This film tell a strange triangle love story. Film also focus on the celebration and music of Youngsters. The film will be produced by A.C Sudheenthranath under Nath Movie Entertinement. Firos Nad doing the Music.

Cast
 Nivas Babu
 Madhura Munjal
 Keerthana Poduval
 Salim Kumar
 Neena Kurup

References

Indian romantic drama films
2010s Malayalam-language films
2014 films
2014 romantic drama films